Mandy Minella was the defending champion but decided not to participate.

Stephanie Vogt won in the final 6–4, 6–1 against Kathinka von Deichmann.

Seeds

 Stephanie Vogt (champions)
 Kimberley Cassar (quarterfinals)
  Claudine Schaul (semifinals)
 Kathinka von Deichmann (final)

Draw

References
 Main Draw

Tennis at the 2011 Games of the Small States of Europe